The Carpenter Ministry was the 34th Ministry of the Government of Western Australia, and was led by Labor Premier Alan Carpenter and his deputy Eric Ripper. It succeeded the Gallop Ministry on 3 February 2006 due to the retirement of Dr Geoff Gallop from politics on 25 January, and was in turn succeeded by the Barnett Ministry on 23 September 2008 after the Labor Party lost government at the state election held on 6 September.

First Ministry
The Governor, Ken Michael, designated 17 principal executive offices of the Government under section 43(2) of the Constitution Acts Amendment Act 1899. The following ministers and parliamentary secretaries were then appointed to the positions, and served until the reconstitution of the Ministry on 13 December 2006. The list below is ordered by decreasing seniority within the Cabinet, as indicated by the Government Gazette and the Hansard index.

 On 8 May 2006, John D'Orazio, who had driven his ministerial car for two months with a suspended licence, was removed from his portfolios of Police and Emergency Services and Community Safety, which were reallocated to John Kobelke, and Justice, which was reallocated to Margaret Quirk. He was assigned to Quirk's portfolios of Disability Services and Citizenship and Multicultural Interests, and David Templeman's portfolio of Seniors and Volunteering. The following day, he resigned from the Ministry following criticism of the decision to retain him in Cabinet, and his new portfolios returned to their original holders.
 On 26 May 2006, Tony McRae, previously a Parliamentary Secretary, was promoted to the Ministry, and was allocated the portfolios of Disability Services, Citizenship and Multicultural Interests previously held by Margaret Quirk, and became Minister assisting the Minister for Planning and Infrastructure, previously filled by David Templeman. The portfolio of Justice, held by Margaret Quirk, was renamed Corrective Services, while Martin Whitely was appointed to replace McRae as a Parliamentary Secretary.
 On 9 November 2006, Norm Marlborough was removed from the Ministry and resigned from Parliament, triggering a by-election in his seat. His portfolio of Small Business was reallocated to Margaret Quirk, while Peel and the South West were reallocated to Mark McGowan.

Second Ministry
On 13 December 2006, the Premier announced a major Cabinet reshuffle, with only five ministers being unaffected. Three ministers were demoted to junior posts—former Minister for Education Ljiljanna Ravlich, former Minister for Resources John Bowler and former Minister for Indigenous Affairs Sheila McHale. It was decided not to replace Norm Marlborough's position in the cabinet, vacated a month earlier, so the number of ministers decreased from 17 to 16. Apart from Tony McRae and John Bowler, the members remained Ministers until the end of the Carpenter Ministry on 23 September 2008.

 On 26 February 2007, Minister for the Environment Tony McRae was removed from the Ministry. Mark McGowan temporarily assumed McRae's three portfolios.
 On 27 February 2007, John Bowler was removed from the Ministry and resigned from the Labor Party after details of his relationship with former Premier Brian Burke and fellow lobbyist Julian Grill. On 2 March 2007, his term as a minister formally concluded and the Premier reshuffled the Cabinet. The ministry was reduced from 16 to 15 members, whilst parliamentary secretary Sue Ellery was promoted to the ministry and the portfolios formerly assigned to McRae and Bowler were distributed.

Notes

References
 Hansard Indexes for 2006 and 2007, "Legislature of Western Australia"

Western Australian ministries
Australian Labor Party ministries in Western Australia
Ministries of Elizabeth II